Battle of the Ages was an American television program originally broadcast on the DuMont Television Network and later CBS.

DuMont version 
It was a prime time game show/talent contest which pitted children against adult celebrities. Whichever team won would have their winnings donated to either the Professional Children's School (the kids) or the Actors' Fund of America (the adults). The DuMont version ran from January 1 to July 17, 1952, and was hosted by John Reed King.

Competitors included The Charioteers and Henny Youngman.

CBS version 
The series was then aired by CBS on Saturdays at 10:30pm ET beginning on September 6, 1952. The age division for team members was 35, and it was hosted by Morey Amsterdam. Members of the two teams participated in "song, dance, comedy and instrumental competition", with the winning team determined by applause of the audience. It ended on November 29, 1952.

This version originated live at WCBS-TV with Serutan as the sponsor. Norman S. Livingston was the producer, Andrew McCullough was the director, and Milton DeLugg directed the music.

Competitors included Maxine Sullivan and W. C. Handy.

See also
List of programs broadcast by the DuMont Television Network
List of surviving DuMont Television Network broadcasts
1952-1953 United States network television schedule

References

Bibliography
David Weinstein, The Forgotten Network: DuMont and the Birth of American Television (Philadelphia: Temple University Press, 2004)

External links

DuMont historical website

Black-and-white American television shows
DuMont Television Network original programming
English-language television shows
CBS original programming
1950s American game shows
1952 American television series debuts
1952 American television series endings